In financial mathematics, a risk measure is used to determine the amount of an asset or set of assets (traditionally currency) to be kept in reserve.  The purpose of this reserve is to make the risks taken by financial institutions, such as banks and insurance companies, acceptable to the regulator.  In recent years attention has turned towards convex and coherent risk measurement.

Mathematically
A risk measure is defined as a mapping from a set of random variables to the real numbers. This set of random variables represents portfolio returns. A risk measure  should have certain properties:

 Normalized
 

 Translative
 

 Monotone

Set-valued
Set-valued risk measures are useful for markets with transaction costs.

Mathematically

 Normalized
 

 Translative in M
 

 Monotone

Examples 

 Value at risk
 Expected shortfall
 Superposed risk measures
 Entropic value at risk
Drawdown
 Tail conditional expectation
 Entropic risk measure
 Superhedging price
 Expectile

Variance
Variance (or standard deviation) is not a risk measure in the above sense. This can be seen since it has neither the translation property nor monotonicity.  That is,  for all , and a simple counterexample for monotonicity can be found.  The standard deviation is a deviation risk measure. To avoid any confusion, note that deviation risk measures, such as variance and standard deviation are sometimes called risk measures in different fields.

Relation to acceptance set
There is a one-to-one correspondence between an acceptance set and a corresponding risk measure.

Risk measure to acceptance set
 If  is a (scalar) risk measure then  is an acceptance set.
 If  is a set-valued risk measure then  is an acceptance set.

Acceptance set to risk measure
 If  is an acceptance set (in 1-d) then  defines a (scalar) risk measure.
 If  is an acceptance set then  is a set-valued risk measure.

Relation with deviation risk measure
There is a one-to-one relationship between a deviation risk measure D and an expectation-bounded risk measure  where for any 
 
 .

See also 
 Coherent risk measure
 Dynamic risk measure
 Managerial risk accounting
 Risk management
 Risk metric - the abstract concept that a risk measure quantifies
 RiskMetrics - a model for risk management
 Spectral risk measure
 Distortion risk measure
 Value at risk
 Conditional value-at-risk
 Entropic value at risk
 Risk return ratio

References

Further reading

 
 

Actuarial science
Financial risk modeling